Tellus is a Latin word meaning "Earth" and may refer to:

 An alternative name for the planet Earth
 Tellus of Athens, a citizen of ancient Athens who was thought to be the happiest of men
 Tellus Mater or Terra Mater, the ancient Roman earth mother goddess
 Tellus Science Museum in Cartersville, Georgia
 Tellus A, a scientific journal of Dynamic Meteorology and Oceanography
 Tellus B, a scientific journal of Chemical and Physical Meteorology
 Tellus Institute, an American environmental think tank
 Tellus (comics), a comic book character and member of the Legion of Super-Heroes
 A fictional human colony in the TV series Space: Above and Beyond
 Tellus Audio Cassette Magazine, an extinct nonprofit audio art project
 IK Tellus, a sports club based in Tellusborg in Stockholm, Sweden

See also
Bematistes tellus, a butterfly in the family Nymphalidae
Telluric (disambiguation)
Tellurium
Terra (disambiguation)